Mary Jesse (born November 22, 1964) is an American technology and media pioneer having led early work on several groundbreaking innovations and influential technologies in the late 20th century and early 21st century.

Jesse is an executive, entrepreneur, strategist, inventor, professional electrical engineer, author, and wireless pioneer.

Jesse is widely regarded as a leader of gender diversity in business and STEM (science, technology, engineering and mathematics).

Jesse was a co-founder of AT&T's Project Angel the fixed wireless local loop project which led to the acquisition of McCaw cellular and the creation of AT&T wireless where she served as a Vice-President and corporate officer. She also led the first large scale deployment of commercial wireless data in US history for United Parcel Service. Jesse has been Managing Partner of Hexagon Blue LLC since January 2003.

Jesse is currently CEO and board member at MTI, a global leader in retail merchandising and global services.

Early life

Childhood 
Jesse is a native of San Jose, California. Her father spent his entire career working as an electrical engineer on NASA Space Programs at Ames Research Center, and was part of the Pioneer 10 team that received the Nelson P. Jackson Aerospace Award. Her sister, Rose Herrera served on the San Jose City Council for 8 years, and was vice-mayor from 2014 to 2016.

Education 
With digital audio pioneer Thomas Stockham as department chair and professor in digital audio communications, Jesse attended University of Utah graduating with a bachelor of science in electrical engineering with honors. She also attended Santa Clara University, graduating with a master of science in electrical engineering.

Career 
A native of Northern California, Jesse began her career as an electrical engineering research associate at the University of Utah working with Om Gandi on setting the first standards for exposure to radio waves from electronic devices.  During this period, she published her thesis entitled "Measurement of the Complex Permittivity of Biological Samples at Millimeter Wavelengths". After college, Jesse went on to work at Sperry Defense Products Group (now Unisys). At Sperry, Jesse worked on then classified air-to-ground communication systems which included the SR-71 and U-2 aircraft.

In the late 1980s, Jesse moved to Stanford Telecommunications to work with company founder James Spilker one of the inventors of the Global Positioning System (GPS).

In 1991, Jesse moved from Silicon Valley to Seattle, Washington to work for McCaw Cellular Communications, Inc. (MCCI) led by Craig McCaw.  During the course of her tenure at MCCI Jesse worked closely with many pioneers in mobile communications and technology including Craig McCaw, Martin Cooper, Tom Alberg, Peter Currie, Nick Kauser, Wayne Perry, Steve Hooper and many others, leading significant programs.

Jesse was Vice President of Strategic Technology in 1994 when AT&T acquired McCaw Cellular which formed the basis of AT&T Wireless Services. Jesse was a corporate officer and Vice President of Technology Development at AT&T Wireless through 1998 when she left AT&T.  Since 1998, Jesse has been a co-founder, officer, executive and board member at a variety of private and public technology companies.

In addition, she has served on several business and STEM related non-profit board including Northwest Entrepreneurs Network, University of Washington Bothell School of STEM board, Washington State University Electrical Engineering board, City of Bellevue Chamber board of directors and Washington Governor's University business council.

Jesse currently serves as board member and chief executive officer of MTI founded in 1977 a mid-market, privately-held provider of security and display hardware, Internet of things software and global services in retail, healthcare, quick serve restaurant (QSR) and hospitality.

Diversity and women leadership 
Jesse is strong advocate of gender diversity in business and representation on board of directors. She currently serves as an independent director for Bsquare (NASDAQ: BSQR), chair of the governance and nominating committee and member of the audit committee.  She also serves on the board of MTI.

Jesse is an alumna of and mentor for Springboard Enterprises the world's most successful venture catalyst and fund focused solely on providing capital, training and mentoring to female entrepreneurs.

Jesse is an alumna of and mentor for Onboarding Women, a program developed by Deloitte, PerkinsCoie, Madrona Venture Fund and Spencer Stuart that seeks to increase the number of women on boards.

As an early female technology leader and entrepreneur, Jesse speaks and writes on business, technology, STEM, women and education.

Patents 
Jesse is prolific inventor, innovator and entrepreneur.  She is listed as an author on more than 19 US and International technology patents and applications.

List of patents 

 9,736,101 Automated communications system 
 9,356,896 Automated announcement-and-bulletins system
 9,088,388 Method for frequency division duplex communications
 8,948,352 Multi-channel interactive message response system
 8,693,432 Method for frequency division duplex communications
 8,305,990 Method for frequency division duplex communications
 7,983,217 Method for frequency division duplex communications
 7,606,594 Radio system having distributed real-time processing
 7,450,542 Method for frequency division duplex communications 
 7,149,238 Highly bandwidth-efficient communications
 7,106,781 Highly bandwidth-efficient communications
 7,095,708 Methods and apparatus for use in communicating voice and high speed data in a wireless communication system
 6,853,629 Method for frequency division duplex communications
 6,778,518 Distributed radio system with multiple transceivers for simulcasting and selective processing of received signals
 6,621,851 Priority messaging method for a discrete multi-tone spread spectrum communications system
 6,560,209 Method for frequency division duplex communications
 6,480,522 Method of polling second stations for functional quality and maintenance data in a discrete multi-tone spread spectrum communications system
 6,359,923 Highly bandwidth efficient communications
 5,933,421 Method for frequency division duplex communications

References 

1964 births
Living people
American electrical engineers
American media executives
American women in business
People from San Jose, California
Santa Clara University alumni
Unisys
University of Utah alumni